Raymond Mastrotto (Auch, 1 November 1934 — Labatut, 11 March 1984) was a French professional road bicycle racer. In 1962, Mastrotto won the Critérium du Dauphiné Libéré. At the end of his career, in 1967, he also won a stage of the 1967 Tour de France. In 1968, Mastrotto had to end his career after he was hit by a car during a training.

Major results

1960
Circuit des cols Pyrénéens
Tour de France:
6th place overall classification
1961
Villard de Lans
1962
Critérium du Dauphiné Libéré
1963
Sauvignes
1966
Boucles du Bas-Limousin
1967
Tour de France:
Winner stage 17

External links 

Official Tour de France results for Raymond Mastrotto

French male cyclists
1934 births
1984 deaths
French Tour de France stage winners
People from Auch
Sportspeople from Gers
Cyclists from Occitania (administrative region)